The Johnnie Walker Classic was a European Tour golf tournament which was played in the Asia-Pacific region. Johnnie Walker is a brand name and the owners have a long history of tournament sponsorship. They also sponsored the Johnnie Walker Championship at Gleneagles which was a European Tour event played in Scotland. 

The event was originally called the Johnnie Walker Asian Classic. There was a tournament already called the Johnnie Walker Classic in Australia, but when that event ceased in 1992, the word Asian was dropped from the name.

History
In 1989 Johnnie Walker sponsored the Hong Kong Open, and it was decided to establish an additional tournament which it would sponsor on an ongoing basis. This tournament was called the Johnnie Walker Asian Classic, and was first staged in Hong Kong in 1990. It later evolved into a traveling event that was primarily utilized by its sponsor as a marketing strategy in the Asia Pacific region. In 1992 it became the first event to be sanctioned by the European Tour in East Asia (the Dubai Desert Classic was the first in Asia as a whole). 

In 1993 the word Asian was dropped from the title. In 2005 the tournament was held in China for the first time, as part of the European Tour's push into China, which saw four events held in mainland China and one in Hong Kong in the 2005 season. The location of the tournament changes every year.

The tournament was co-sanctioned with the PGA Tour of Australasia from 1996, and by the Asian Tour from 1999. 

In 2005 the tri-sanctioned event had a field consisting of 60 European Tour players, 60 Asian Tour players, 28 PGA Tour of Australasia players, and 8 sponsors' invitees. The prize fund was £1,250,000. This amount is large by Asian and Australasian Tour standards, but not by European Tour or PGA Tour standards. However the tournament attracts a number of the World's leading players each year by paying them large appearance fees. 

Nine of the first fourteen editions were won by players who have topped the Official World Golf Ranking at some point in their career (Faldo, Els and Woods twice each; Woosnam, Norman and Couples once each).

Winners

Notes

References

External links
Coverage on the European Tour's official site

Former European Tour events
Former PGA Tour of Australasia events
Former Asian Tour events
Golf tournaments in Hong Kong
Golf tournaments in Singapore
Golf tournaments in Australia
Golf in Western Australia
Golf tournaments in Thailand
Golf tournaments in the Philippines
Golf tournaments in Taiwan
Diageo
Recurring sporting events established in 1990
Recurring sporting events disestablished in 2009